Ellen Coleman may refer to:

Ellen Coleman (composer) (1886–1973), English conductor and composer
Ellen Coleman (footballer) (born 1995), Ghanaian footballer